Le Neubourg is a commune in Eure, Normandy, France. The composer and organist Roger Boucher (1885–1918) was born in Le Neubourg.

History
In the 11th century the manor of Le Neubourg was a subsidiary holding of Roger de Beaumont (d.1094), a principal adviser to William the Conqueror, and feudal lord of Beaumont-le-Roger situated 12 km to the SW. He gave the manor to his second son Henry de Beaumont (c.1048-1119), who was created 1st Earl of Warwick in 1088 and who adopted for himself and his descendants the surname "de Newburgh", the Anglicised adjectival form of his Norman lordship. The name was Latinised to de Novo Burgo, meaning "from the new borough/town".

Population

See also
Communes of the Eure department

References

Communes of Eure